Hirose Financial UK Ltd. is a UK-based retail foreign exchange broker that provides foreign exchange (forex, fx) trading on margin through its own online trading platform called LION Trader.  It is a subsidiary of Japanese FX company Hirose Financial that provides online trading solution to forex traders.

History
Hirose Company (called Hirose Tusyo) was incorporated in Japan in 2004, to offer foreign exchange trading and investment services after regulatory changes in Japan allowing retail forex trading.

Hirose focused on the utilization of its Japanese based products to grow a its business within an environment of a large number of competitors. As result, as at 2011 Hirose's global number of client accounts exceed 120,000 and trading volume reached $76 billion.

In 2010 Hirose decided to expand outside its home country by setting up Hirose Financial UK, and becoming the first Japanese forex broker licensed in London, UK.

Business model
Hirose Financial UK is a NDD (No Dealing Desk) and STP (straight-through processing) forex broker. This means that client orders are routed directly to liquidity providers (banks, other financial institutions) and Hirose does not act as a market maker.

Technology
Hirose's trading platform, LION, is based on the Act Forex (ActTrader) system, which can facilitate trades over single or multiple client terminals (PC based, web based, Android phones, iPhone, and iPad). It also provides traders with custom indicators, trading algos/EAs and programmable strategies as an alternative to MetaTrader.

Hirose uses "Oracle Coherence," an in-memory data grid products, to improve execution performance. The application server also uses an "Oracle WebLogic Server".

See also
Hirose Tusyo (ヒロセ通商)

References

Financial services companies established in 2010
Financial services companies based in London
Foreign exchange companies
Financial derivative trading companies
British companies established in 2010